Qaleh-ye Shater Bali (also Romanized as Qal‘eh-ye Shāţer Bālī; also known as Qal‘eh Shātirbāle and Shāţer Bālī) is a village in Sardrud-e Sofla Rural District, Sardrud District, Razan County, Hamadan Province, Iran. At the 2006 census, its population was 800, in 203 families.

References 

Populated places in Razan County